Everything You Know Is Wrong may refer to:

Audio 

 Everything You Know Is Wrong, a 1974 comedy album by The Firesign Theatre
 Everything You Know Is Wrong, a song on the 1996 Bad Hair Day album by "Weird Al" Yankovic
 Everything You Know Is Wrong, a song on the 2004 Un album by Chumbawamba
 Everything You Know is Wrong, a song on the 2016 Adult Swim album by Prurient
 Everything You Know is Wrong, a song on the 2017 Pop Voodoo album by Black Grape

Literature 

 Everything You Know Is Wrong, a 1995 book by Paul Kirchner
 Everything You Know Is Wrong, a 1997 book by Lloyd Pye
 Everything You Know Is Wrong, a 2002 book by Russ Kick